Cyperus sanguinolentus, the purple-glume flat sedge, is an erect sedge, solitary or tufted, growing from 5 to 80 cm tall. A widespread species, naturally found in many parts of Africa, India, Asia and Australasia. The specific epithet sanguinolentus is from Latin, and refers blood red colour of the seed.

References

External links 

 Cyperus sanguinolentus occurrence data from the Australasian Virtual Herbarium
Cyperus sanguinolentus occurrence data from GBIF

Plants described in 1805
Flora of Australia
Flora of Africa
Flora of tropical Asia
Flora of temperate Asia
sanguinolentus